Caiado is a surname. Notable people with the surname include:

David Caiado (born 1987), Portuguese footballer
Fernando Caiado (1925–2006), Portuguese footballer and manager
Manoela Caiado (born 1989), Brazilian journalist
Ronaldo Caiado (born 1949), Brazilian politician
Tyson Caiado (born 1988), Indian footballer